José António Barreto Travassos (22 February 1926 – 12 February 2002) was a Portuguese footballer who played as a forward.

Club career
Born in Lisbon, Travassos joined Sporting CP in 1946 from G.D. CUF. During his spell with the club, he appeared in 321 games in all competitions and scored 128 goals, being part of an attacking line dubbed Cinco Violinos (Five Violins) that also included Albano, Jesus Correia, Fernando Peyroteo and Manuel Vasques and winning eight Primeira Liga championships and two Taça de Portugal trophies.

In the 1948–49 season, Travassos netted a career-best 16 goals to help the Lions to win the domestic league ahead of S.L. Benfica. He retired in 1959 at the age of 33, dying in his hometown at the age of 75.

International career
Travassos won 35 caps for the Portugal national team over 11 years, scoring six times. His debut came on 5 January 1947 in a 2–2 friendly draw against Switzerland in the Portuguese capital and, 21 days later and in another home exhibition game, netted a brace to help defeat Spain 4–1.

Travassos was one of the first Portuguese footballers to reach international recognition, playing in 1955 for a FIFA side that defeated England 4–1 in Belfast. For this achievement, he was dubbed "Zé da Europa" (Europe Joe).

References

External links

1926 births
2002 deaths
Portuguese footballers
Footballers from Lisbon
Association football forwards
Primeira Liga players
Liga Portugal 2 players
G.D. Fabril players
Sporting CP footballers
Portugal international footballers